Fredericksburg Lady Gunners was an American women’s soccer team, founded in 2006. The team is a member of the United Soccer Leagues W-League, and played in the Northeast Division of the Eastern Conference. The team folded after the 2009 season.

The team played their home games at the Fredericksburg Field House in the city of Fredericksburg, Virginia, 52 miles south-west of Washington, D.C. The club's colors were dark blue, red and white.

The team was a sister organization of the men's Fredericksburg Gunners team, which plays in the USL Premier Development League.

2008 Roster

Year-by-year

Coaches
  Gerry Austin 2008–2009

Stadia
 Fredericksburg Field House, Fredericksburg, Virginia 2008-2009

External links
 Fredericksburg Gunners

   

Women's soccer clubs in the United States
Soccer clubs in Virginia
Defunct USL W-League (1995–2015) teams
2006 establishments in Virginia
2009 disestablishments in Virginia
Association football clubs established in 2006
Association football clubs disestablished in 2009
Fredericksburg, Virginia
Women's sports in Virginia